NAC may refer to:

Arts
 National Arts Centre, Canada
 National Arts Club, New York, United States
 National Arts Council, Singapore, a statutory board of the Singapore government
 Narodowe Archiwum Cyfrowe, Polish National Digital Archives
 New adult contemporary, a name once used for the smooth jazz radio format

Aviation
 NAC Air, a former Native owned air carrier, Canada
 NAC Fieldmaster, British agricultural aircraft
 NAC, the IATA code for Naracoorte Airport in South Australia, Australia
 Namibia Airports Company, operator of eight airports in Namibia
 National Air Communications, a British government organisation 1939–1940
 National Airways Corporation (South Africa), a South African commercial aviation company
 Nauru Air Corporation, the national airline of the Pacific island Republic of Nauru
 New Zealand National Airways Corporation, the former national domestic airline of New Zealand
 Northern Air Cargo, a cargo airline based in Anchorage, Alaska, U.S.

Organisations

Companies
 NAC Architecture, a U.S. design firm
 Nanjing Automobile (Group) Corporation, a Chinese subsidiary of SAIC
 Nickel Asia Corporation, largest producer of nickel ore in the Philippines
 Nordic Aviation Capital, Danish based airline lessor

Education
 Nakanihon Automotive College, a private junior college in Sakahogi, Gifu, Japan
 National Academy of Construction, an Indian college
 Nowra Anglican College, an Anglican College based in Nowra, Australia
 Nunavut Arctic College, a nursing school in Canada

Politics
 New Administrative Capital, the new capital center being built to replace Cairo as Egypt's government center
 National Aboriginal Conference, Australian governmental body 1973–1985
 National Administrative Council, former governing body of the Independent Labour Party in the UK
 National Advisory Council, an advisory body set up to monitor the implementation of the UPA government's manifesto in India
 New Agenda Coalition, an international group advocating nuclear disarmament
 North Atlantic Council, the most senior political governing body of NATO
 Nyasaland African Congress, a political party in Malawi

Religion
 Native American Church, the most widespread indigenous religion among Native Americans
 New Apostolic Church, a chiliastic church
 Pontifical North American College, an American seminary in Rome, Italy

Other organizations
 National Abortion Campaign, a former UK campaigning group for abortion rights
 National Action Committee on the Status of Women, a Canadian feminist activist organization
 National Agricultural Centre, now renamed Stoneleigh Park, UK

Media
 NAC TV, Neepawa, Manitoba, Canada
 Newspaper Agency Corporation, Salt Lake City, Utah, U.S

Science and technology

Medicine
 N-Acetylcarnosine, a compound related to carnosine
 N-Acetylcysteine, a medication
 Nucleus accumbens, a region in the brain
 N-Acetyl as in GlcNAc and GalNAc

Other science and technology
 Natural Area Code, a geocode system
 Network Access Code, for public safety radios
 Network Access Control
 Network Admission Control
 North Atlantic Current

Sports

Netherlands
 NAC Basketbal, basketball club based in Breda, Netherland
 NAC Breda, football club from Breda, Netherlands
 NAC Stadion, a multi-use stadium in Breda, Netherlands

United States
 Nashville Athletic Club, a sports club for young men in Nashville, Tennessee, U.S.
 North Atlantic Conference, a U.S. collegiate athletic conference based in New England, U.S.
 Northern Athletics Conference, former name of the U.S. collegiate athletic conference based in the Midwest U.S.

Other places
 CA Oradea, football club based in Oradea, Bihor County, Romania
 Nacional Atlético Clube (disambiguation), several Brazilian football teams
 National Aquatic Centre, indoor aquatics facility in Blanchardstown, Dublin, Ireland
 North America Challenge, a laser tag competition in the US and Canada

Other uses
 Nam Cheong station, of the Mass Transit Railway (MTR), Hong Kong
 New Atlantic Charter, a 2021 agreement between the UK and US
 North America and the Caribbean, see List of country groupings
 North American Confederacy, a fictional government in the novel The Probability Broach by L. Neil Smith
 Notified Area Council or nagar panchayat, one of the three types of urban system in India

See also

 NACS (disambiguation)
 Knack (disambiguation)
 Nack (disambiguation)
 Nach (disambiguation)
 Nakh (disambiguation)
 Nak (disambiguation)
 naq (disambiguation)